Intoxication — or poisoning, especially by an alcoholic or narcotic substance — may refer to:
 Substance intoxication:
 Alcohol intoxication
 LSD intoxication
 Toxidrome
 Tobacco intoxication
 Cannabis intoxication 
 Cocaine intoxication
 Caffeine#Caffeine intoxication
 Stimulant#Effects
 Water intoxication 
 Drug overdose
 Inhalant abuse#Administration and effects
 Intoxication (film), a 1919 German film directed by Ernst Lubitsch
 Intoxication (Shaggy album)
 Intoxication (The Habibis album), 1998
 "Intoxication", a song by Disturbed from Believe
 "Intoxication", a single by Shriekback from their Go Bang! album

See also
Intoxicated (disambiguation)